Munyang Station is a station of Daegu Metro Line 2 in Munyang-ri, Dasa-eup, Dalseong County, Daegu, South Korea. The station is located near at the Munyang Depot.

Munyang Depot
On the north side of the station are the outdoor storage yard and maintenance depot for Line 2 trains.

Station layout

Gallery

External links 
  Cyber station information from Daegu Metropolitan Transit Corporation

Daegu Metro stations
Dalseong County
Railway stations opened in 2005